The 2013 Pan American Junior Championships was held at the Estadio Alfonso Galvis Duque in Medellin, Colombia, from 23–25 August. The competition was originally scheduled for 2–4 August in Lima, Peru. Lima was ruled out as the host and the dates were also amended in April, due to the clash with the 2013 World Games in Cali and its proximity to the 2013 World Championships in Athletics.

The United States easily topped the medal table with fifteen gold medals and 38 medals in total, continuing their streak as the best performing nation at the championships (bar one interruption at the 2001 edition). Cuba and Canada, the other traditionally strong nations in the region, were the next best performers: Cuba won eight golds in its haul of eleven medals while Canada had the second largest total with 19 medals (six of them gold). Brazil and Mexico each took four golds and the host nation Colombia claimed twelve medals overall. Twenty-one of the 36 participating nations reached the medal table.

Two championship record marks were bettered in 2013, both of the women's field events. In the pole vault Canada's Alysha Newman and Venezuela's Robeilys Peinado both cleared . Newman broke the North American junior record and Peinado improved her own Venezuelan record. Another record of note was the South American junior record of  13.42 seconds in the 110 metres hurdles, set by Colombia's Juan Carlos Moreno. Felipe dos Santos of Brazil also broke the regional junior record with his winning score of 7762 points in the decathlon.

Among the participants, two completed doubles: Arialis Gandulla Martínez was the winner of both the women's 100 metres and 200 metres while Peru's Zulema Huacasi claimed both the 3000 metres flat and steeplechase titles. Brazil had two multiple medallists in Izabela da Silva (women's discus throw winner and shot put runner-up) and Thiago do Rosário (runner-up in both the men's 1500 metres and 5000 metres). Sage Watson of Canada won the 400 metres hurdles title, a silver in the 4×400 m relay, and a bronze in the flat race. Ecuadorian Angela Tenorio was a minor medallist in both the women's sprints.

Several medallists from the 2013 World Youth Championships in Athletics were present. Lázaro Martínez Santrayu repeated his triple jump title and Christoff Bryan won another men's high jump medal. Peinado and Tenorio had also won medals at the youth event.

Medal summary

Men

Martínez and White-Edwards had the same best mark of 16.49 m but Martínez took the gold by merit of his superior second best jump (16.35 m to White-Edwards' 16.29 m).

Women

Medal table

Participation

References

Results
Official results

External links
Official website 

Pan American
Pan American
International athletics competitions hosted by Colombia